Lonely Street can refer to:

 "Lonely Street" (song), a 1958 song by Carl Belew
 Lonely Street (Kitty Wells album), 1958, named after the song
 Lonely Street (Andy Williams album), 1959, named after the song
 Lonely Street (film), a 2009 film based on the Steve Brewer novel by the same name